Forest growth models are mathematical or computer models to project the future state and yields of forest stands or forest trees, over a time scale of from a few years to many decades. 

Structure and function of growth models vary: some are purely empirical, based on the reproduction of past observations, while others explicitly mimic specific processes relative to tree ecophysiology, stand dynamics, etc. Typically, growth models use forest inventory data and site characteristics, such as soil type, drainage class, average annual temperature, precipitation, etc., as input for growth projections. Most models are calibrated for a given region and a given set of stand types, defined by the species composition and the management regime (even-aged versus uneven-aged stands, managed versus unmanaged stands).

Some models consider only stand growth and dynamics processes, while other can simulate the effect of silviculture practices (plantation, partial harvest, fertilization, etc.).

Typology of models

Model types

Scale/resolution

 Whole stand model: 
 Stand table model: 
 Tree list model:

Construction

"Empirical models seek principally to describe the statistical relationships among data with limited regard to an object's internal structure, rules, or behaviour. In contrast, process models seek primarily to describe data using key mechanisms or processes that determine an object's internal structure, rules, and behaviour."

Models can be either distance-independent or distance-dependent. In the later case, geographical positions of trees are known and used for modeling competition and/or dispersion processes.

Forest Region
 refers to Forest Regions of Canada

Species 
 Eastern SPF: Balsam fir, black, red and white spruce, jack pine
 Western SPF: Spruce-Pine-Fir
 Other western softwoods: Western Red cedar, western hemlock
 Other eastern softwood: white and red pines, eastern white cedar
 Tolerant hardwoods: Maples, yellow birch, Beech, Oaks,
 Boreal hardwoods: Aspen, white birch

Regime 
 Even-aged Vs. uneven-aged

Silviculture 
 Unmanaged Vs. managed stands (plantation, tending, thinning, fertilization, recurrent partial cuttings, etc.)

Yields 
Growth model outputs can fall in the following categories:
 Tree attributes: species, diameter at breast height, taper, vigour index, quality grade, crown dimensions, etc.
 Stand attributes: living tree density, dead tree density, mean diameter at breast height, dominant height, basal area, crown closure, etc.
 Biomass production: biomass or volume per compartment (bole, branches, leafs, roots), carbon storage, etc.
 Ecophysiologial indicators: respiration, net productivity, water consumption, heat transfer, etc.
 Lumber and fiber products: merchantable volume, lumber volume per grade, pulp volume, wood quality indicators (MOE, MOR,...), etc.
 Ecological indicators: volume of large woody debris, snag density, species diversity index, etc.
 Economic indicators: net value of standing trees, net present value (NPV), cash flow, land expectation value, etc.

Climate input 
 Identifies models that consider climate variables as input (temperature, precipitations, etc.)

Regeneration 
 Identifies models that make projections on natural regeneration (establishment, early growth and survival, or tree recruitment to the merchantable stand).

Catalog 

Please refer to the lexicon for the definitions of the variables and the categories used in this table.

References 

Forestry in Canada